Hayley Saunders (born 2 July 1989 in Gore, New Zealand) is a New Zealand netball player and member of the Southern Steel team in the ANZ Championship. Saunders first represented Southland in the National Championships from 2007–08, before moving to the University of Otago in Dunedin and playing for Otago in 2009.

After a strong 2009 season, Saunders was selected for the Southern Steel in their 2010 ANZ Championship campaign, making her debut against the Waikato Bay of Plenty Magic. That year she was also selected for the FastNet Ferns to represent New Zealand at the 2010 World Netball Series in Liverpool.

References 

New Zealand netball players
Northern Mystics players
Southern Steel players
ANZ Championship players
1989 births
Living people
People educated at St Peter's College, Gore
People from Gore, New Zealand
New Zealand international Fast5 players
Waikato Bay of Plenty Magic players